Ali Dahleb (born August 25, 1969) is a retired Algerian international football player.

Career
Dahleb spent the majority of his career with WA Tlemcen, with brief stints with US Chaouia, with whom he won the league title, and ASM Oran. He also represented Algeria at the 1996 African Cup of Nations and the 1998 African Cup of Nations.

Honours
 Won the Algerian Championnat National once with US Chaouia in 1994
 Won the Arab Champions League once with WA Tlemcen in 1998
 Won the Algerian Cup twice with WA Tlemcen in 1998 and 2002

References

External links
 
 

1969 births
1996 African Cup of Nations players
1998 African Cup of Nations players
Living people
People from El Harrach
Algerian footballers
Algeria international footballers
ASM Oran players
US Chaouia players
WA Tlemcen players
Association football midfielders
21st-century Algerian people